Pirtikan or Pirtikyan may refer to:
Dzoragyukh, Aragatsotn, Armenia, formerly Nerkin Pirtikan
Tsakhkasar, Armenia, formerly Verin Pirtikan